The 2006 Brisbane Broncos season was the nineteenth in the club's history. Coached by Wayne Bennett and captained by Darren Lockyer, they won the NRL's 2006 Telstra Premiership, finishing the regular season in 3rd place before going on to defeat the first-placed Melbourne Storm in the 2006 NRL Grand Final (their 6th).

Season summary 
The Broncos did not start the 2006 season well, suffering a 36–4 defeat by the previous year's runners-up, the North Queensland Cowboys in the first round. This was the 8th consecutive loss for the club and equalled the record for longest losing streak set in 2003. Round 2 saw the Broncos get their first win for the season and their first win since Round 21, 2005, with a 16–12 victory over the Cronulla-Sutherland Sharks (this was the third game in a row in which the Brisbane Broncos beat the Cronulla Sharks 16-12 at Toyota Park). The Broncos then went on to have a strong first half of the season, winning 11 of their first 17 games. Round 8 saw Brisbane produce their biggest comeback in the club's history when they came from 18–0 down at halftime to win 30–28 over the Canberra Raiders. But the year's biggest upset came when the team, missing key players through State of Origin, lost to the last-placed and previously winless South Sydney Rabbitohs 34-14 in Round 14.

After the 2006 State of Origin series finished, Brisbane once again suffered their "post-Origin Slump", losing five consecutive games from Round 18 to Round 23 inclusive. However, strong performances against the competition leaders Melbourne Storm (losing 18–12) and a resounding victory against the Canterbury Bulldogs 30-0 the following week saw a return to form. The Broncos then defeated the injury-struck Parramatta Eels 23-0 in Round 25 and then the New Zealand Warriors 36-12 in Round 26. It was the first time since 1999 that the Broncos conceded no points in consecutive rounds.

Brisbane was heading into the finals with momentum not seen since 2000, but lost to the St. George Illawarra Dragons 20-4 in what was the highest attended Broncos game ever played at Suncorp Stadium at the time. The following week Wayne Bennett agreed to terms to continue coaching the Broncos for a further two years. The Broncos bounced back in the semi-final, defeating the Newcastle Knights by 50–6. Captain Darren Lockyer also became the Broncos' highest point-scorer with 1,077 (breaking Michael De Vere's record of 1,062 points). After trailing 20–6 at half-time against the Bulldogs in the grand final qualifier the team came back in the second half to earn a place in the 2006 NRL Grand Final with a 37–20 victory with Shaun Berrigan scoring a match-turning try in the second half.

It was the sixth time the Broncos made the Grand Final. Their opponents were the Melbourne Storm and the game was the first ever NRL Grand Final not to feature a New South Wales-based club. Despite heading into the game as underdogs, Brisbane won the match 15–8. This saw a fitting farewell to Broncos prop Shane Webcke who retired at the end of the season. The win enabled the Broncos to maintain their perfect record in grand final matches and made Wayne Bennett the most successful coach in grand final history with 6 from 6 with the Broncos. In his first year of coaching he made the Grand Final with the Canberra Raiders but lost, making his record at this time 6 from 7. His current record is 7 from 9 having won a Grand Final with the St. George Illawarra Dragons in 2010.and losing a grand final against the cowboys in 2015

The Broncos were also named "Queensland Sport Team of the Year" at the Queensland Sport Awards.

Match results 

 Game following a State of Origin match

Ladder

Crowds 
The Brisbane Broncos had the biggest NRL season crowd average for 2006. The average crowd (including the Qualifying Final) for 2006 was 32,681

All Games*: Played:28 Total: 754,550 Average: 26,948  Home Games: Played: 13 Total: 424,917 Average: 32,685  Away Games: Played:15 Total: 329,633 Average: 21,976  Finals*: Played: 4 Total: 179,588 Average: 44,897

Grand final 

Brisbane played against minor premiers the Melbourne Storm in the Grand Final and came out 15–8 winners. It was a perfect farewell for retiring prop Shane Webcke. The Broncos maintained their 100% win record in Grand Finals (1992, 1993, 1997, 1998, 2000 and 2006). The six Premierships make Wayne Bennett the most successful club coach in Australian club football history.

Brisbane 15 (TRIES: Hodges, Tate; GOALS: Lockyer 2/2, Parker 1/2; FIELD GOALS: Lockyer)

defeated

Melbourne 8 (TRIES: Turner, King; GOALS: Smith 0/1, Geyer 0/1)

Halftime: Brisbane 8-4

Referee: Paul Simpkins

Stadium: Telstra Stadium (Sydney)

Crowd: 79,609

Clive Churchill Medal: Shaun Berrigan (Brisbane)

When They Scored

10th Minute: Brisbane 2-0 (Darren Lockyer penalty goal)
14th Minute: Melbourne 4-2 (Steve Turner try)
19th Minute: Brisbane 8-4 (Justin Hodges try; Darren Lockyer goal)
48th Minute: 8-8 (Matt King try)
60th Minute: Brisbane 10-8 (Corey Parker penalty goal)
62nd Minute: Brisbane 14-8 (Brent Tate try)
73rd Minute: Brisbane 15-8 (Darren Lockyer field goal)

Honours

League 
 Telstra Premiership

Club 
 Player of the year: Petero Civoniceva
 Rookie of the year: Darius Boyd
 Back of the year: Darren Lockyer
 Forward of the year: Brad Thorn
 Club man of the year: Andrew Gee

Players 

Three Broncos players, Karmichael Hunt, Justin Hodges and Sam Thaiday were selected to make their international representative debut for Australia in 2006.

Bold Players Reperesentive Players for International or State in any year.

Full Backs
 Australian Karmichael Hunt (also played wing)
Wingers
 New Zealander Frazer Anderson
 Australian Scott Minto
 New Zealander Tame Tupou
 Australian Darius Boyd (also played fullback)
Centres
 Australian Shaun Berrigan (also played hooker)
 Australian Justin Hodges (also played fullback)
 Australian Stephen Michaels
 Australian Brent Tate (also played wing)
Halves
 Australian Darren Lockyer (c)
 Australian Casey McGuire
 Australian Shane Perry
 Australian Brett Seymour (contract terminated after Round 22)
Hookers
 Australian Barry Berrigan
 Australian Michael Ennis
Props
 Australian Petero Civoniceva
 Australian Ben Hannant
 Australian Nick Kenny
 Australian Corey Parker
 Australian Dave Taylor
 Australian Sam Thaiday
 Australian Shane Webcke
Second row
 Australian Dane Carlaw
 Australian David Stagg
 Australian / New ZealanderBrad Thorn
 Papua New Guinean Neville Costigan (contract terminated after Round 22)
Locks
 Australian / *New Zealander Tonie Carroll
 New Zealander Greg Eastwood

Scorers

Gains

Losses 
{| class="wikitable" 
! Player !! Notes
|-
| Casey McGuire || Contract with Catalans Dragons (Super League)
|-
| Shane Webcke || Retired at end of season
|-
| Leon Bott || Contract with Cronulla Sharks
|-
| Neville Costigan || Contract Terminated for player misconduct, contract with Canberra Raiders
|-
| Brett Seymour || Contract Terminated for player misconduct, contract with Cronulla Sharks
|-
| Nathan Daly || Contract with Cronulla Sharks
|-
| Scott Minto || Contract with North Queensland Cowboys
|-
| Ben Vaeau || Contract with North Queensland Cowboys
|-
| Joe Clarke || Contract with North Queensland Cowboys
|~

Re-signings

References

External links 
 Rugby League Tables and Statistics
  

Brisbane Broncos seasons
Brisbane Broncos season